The starry owlet-nightjar (Aegotheles tatei), also known as the spangled owlet-nightjar, is a species of bird in the family Aegothelidae.  It is endemic to Papua New Guinea.  Its natural habitat is subtropical or tropical moist lowland forests. It is threatened by habitat loss.

References

starry owlet-nightjar
Birds of Papua New Guinea
starry owlet-nightjar
starry owlet-nightjar
Taxonomy articles created by Polbot